Kéknyelű is a white Hungarian wine grape planted primarily in the Badacsony wine region near Lake Balaton. The grape produces full bodied, smokey wines. 

It was assumed to be identical with the Italian grape variety Picolit.  Nonetheless, in 2006  isoenzymes and microsatellite analyses have confirmed that these two cultivars are different.

References

White wine grape varieties
Grape varieties of Hungary